General Dalrymple may refer to:

Adolphus Dalrymple (1784–1866), British Army general
Campbell Dalrymple (1725–1767), British Army brigadier general
Hew Whitefoord Dalrymple (1750–1830), British Army general
John Dalrymple, 2nd Earl of Stair (1673–1747), British Army general
John Hamilton Elphinstone Dalrymple (1819–1888), British Army general
William Dalrymple (British Army officer) (1736–1807), British Army major general